Pterocactus valentini is a species of flowering plant in the family Cactaceae, native to southern Argentina. Their fruit are samaras.

References

Opuntioideae
Cacti of South America
Endemic flora of Argentina
Flora of South Argentina
Plants described in 1899